Carl Gunnar Lidbom (2 March 1926 – 26 July 2004) was a Swedish jurist. He served as Minister of Commerce and Industry from 1975 and 1976 and as Ambassador of Sweden to France from 1982 to 1992. During his time in the Government Offices, he worked, among other things, on drafting a new Swedish constitution, which transformed the Riksdag from a bicameral legislature into a unicameral one.

Early life
Lidbom was born on 2 March 1926 in Stockholm, Sweden, the son of Gunnar Lidbom, a judge of appeal, and his wife Sally (née Lutteman). He passed studentexamen in 1944 and received a Bachelor of Arts degree in 1947 and a Candidate of Law degree in Stockholm in 1950.

Career
Lidbom did his clerkship in Sollentuna and Färentuna territorial jurisdiction from 1950 to 1953 and worked as an extra legal clerk (fiskal) in the Svea Court of Appeal in 1954,  tingssekr Lindes and Nora territorial jurisdiction in 1955 and as deputy secretary and acting secretary in the Labour Court (Arbetsdomstolen) from 1956 to 1958. He worked as an expert in the Ministry of the Interior in 1959 and in the Ministry of Health and Social Affairs in 1960. Lidbom was assessor in the Svea Court of Appeal in 1961, director (byråchef) in the Ministry of Health and Social Affairs in 1963, deputy director-general (departementsråd) in the Ministry of Justice in 1965 and director there in 1966 and acting director-general for legal affairs (rättschef) there in 1967. Lidbom was then director-general for legal affairs there from 1968 to 1969 and he was appointed became Hovrättsråd in 1969. Lidbom served as a minister without portfolio from 1969 to 1975 and was minister of commerce and industry and head of the Ministry of Commerce and Industry from 1975 to 1976. He was a member of the Riksdag from the Social Democrats from 1974 to 1982. Lidbom then served as Swedish Ambassador to France from 1982 to 1992, the same year his wife died.

Lidbom was assistant teacher in law at Stockholm University from 1959 to 1965 and served as an expert in negotiations, among other things in the Council of Europe and in the International Labour Organization from 1961 to 1965, and as an expert in the Constitutional Preparation (Grundlagberedningen) and in Tax Punishment Law Inquiry (skattestrafflagutredningen) from 1966 as well as the County Democracy Inquiry (Länsdemokratiutredningen). Lidbom was replacement for the deputy chairman of the Labour Court from 1968 to 1969, and had international assignments, among others thing in the Nordic Council, the Council of Europe, OECD, the International Labour Organization, the United Nations Conference on Trade and Development and in the United Nations.

Lidbom went in some circles under the nickname "Calle Batong" and his harsh legislation has also given rise to the term "Lidbomeri", which refers to a hastily written law that often has political intent.

Ebbe Carlsson affair

After the assassination of Olof Palme, Prime Minister Ingvar Carlsson had asked Lidbom to lead an investigation into Säpo's role in, among other things, the assassination of Olof Palme. With the help of his good friend Ebbe Carlsson, a publisher but now also a private investigator, Lidbom begins to investigate the so-called PKK lead. In 1988, Expressen exposed the collaboration and names it the "Ebbe Carlsson affair", which triggered a political scandal that forced the Minister of Justice Anna-Greta Leijon to resign. Some time later, on 9 March 1989, Lidbom was called to answer for his actions before the Committee on the Constitution. The committee's vice chairman Anders Björck questioned the Paris ambassador and Säpo investigator Carl Lidbom. Lidbom accused Björck of coming up with insinuating questions. Lidbom had said in interviews that the letter of recommendation (from Leijon to Carlsson) and the secret Säpo documents that Carlsson came across were not "a big deal" and a "misdemeanor in class with a parking violation". Björck asked if Lidbom had his wife read secret documents. Lidbom just snorted at the question:

 Lidbom: That question is just ridiculous nonsense. You do not get an answer because it is ridiculous nonsense.
 Björck: You have let your wife read secret documents.
 Lidbom: You get no answer because what you are doing is ridiculous nonsense.
 Björck: I do not think it is up to Carl Lidbom to make such statements here. You should behave when you're here! End of story!

Personal life
In 1950, Lidbom married Lena Hesselgren (1927–1992), the daughter of district judge (häradshövding) Ove Hesselgren and Malin (née Lundblad). They had two children: Helen (born 1951) and Mona (born 1954). His wife, who suffered from polio for many years, died in 1992.

Lidbom's personal life was at times the subject of various writings. In 1989, the media aroused interest when he took his mistress aboard a military ship during an official visit to France. Lidbom later came to write a book about the love of his handicapped wife where he also told openly about his infidelity.

Death
Lidbom died on 26 July 2004 and was buried at Kungsbrolunden next to Turinge Church in Turinge-Taxinge Parish (Turinge-Taxinge församling).

Selected bibliography

References

Further reading

External links
Lidbom's hearing in the Committee on the Constitution 

1926 births
2004 deaths
Politicians from Stockholm
Swedish jurists
Swedish Ministers for Trade
Members of the Riksdag from the Social Democrats
Ambassadors of Sweden to France